The 1960 Macdonald Brier, the Canadian men's national curling championship, was held from March 7 to 11, 1960 at Fort William Gardens in Fort William, Ontario. A total of 26,000 fans attended the event.

Team Saskatchewan, who was skipped by Ernie Richardson captured the Brier Tankard with a record of 9-1 in round robin play. This was the third time in which Saskatchewan had captured the Brier championship. Richardson became the third skip to win back-to-back Brier championships joining Gordon Hudson (1928 and 1929) and Matt Baldwin (1957 and 1958). Unlike Hudson and Baldwin before him, Richardson's rink was the first to win back-to-back Briers with the same four team members.

Richardson's rink would go on to complete in the 1960 Scotch Cup in Scotland where they repeated as World Champions defeating Scotland 5 games to none.

Teams
The teams are listed as follows:

Round-robin standings

Round-robin results
All draw times are listed in Eastern Time (UTC-05:00)

Draw 1
Monday, March 7 3:00 PM

Draw 2
Monday, March 7 8:00 PM

Draw 3
Tuesday, March 8 9:00 AM

Draw 4
Tuesday, March 8 2:00 PM

Draw 5
Wednesday, March 9 3:00 PM

Draw 6
Wednesday, March 9 8:00 PM

Draw 7
Thursday, March 10 9:00 AM

Draw 8
Thursday, March 10 3:00 PM

Draw 9
Thursday, March 10 8:00 PM

Draw 10
Friday, March 11 9:30 AM

Draw 11
Friday, March 11 3:00 PM

References

External links 
 Video: 

Macdonald Brier, 1960
The Brier
Sports competitions in Thunder Bay
Curling in Northern Ontario
Macdonald Brier
Macdonald Brier
Curling competitions in Ontario